Zheleznodorozhny razyezd 1062 is a rural locality (a passing loop) in Gmelinskoye Rural Settlement, Staropoltavsky District, Volgograd Oblast, Russia. The population was 7 as of 2010.

References 

Rural localities in Staropoltavsky District